Bőcs is a village in Borsod-Abaúj-Zemplén county, Hungary famous for the Borsod Brewery and its products.

Notable residents 
 Andrei Enescu (1987-), Romanian footballer
 Ignác Irhás (1985-), Hungarian footballer
 Gábor Bardi (1982-), Hungarian footballer

References

External links 
 Street map 
 Official Webpage
 Bőcs KSC futballteam official webpage

Populated places in Borsod-Abaúj-Zemplén County